William Ray Overton (September 19, 1939 – July 14, 1987) was a United States district judge of the United States District Court for the Eastern District of Arkansas.

Education and career

Born in Malvern, Arkansas, Overton received a Bachelor of Arts degree and a Bachelor of Science degree concurrently from the University of Arkansas in 1961, and a Bachelor of Laws from the University of Arkansas School of Law in 1964. He was in private practice of law in Little Rock, Arkansas from 1964 to 1979.

Federal judicial service

Overton was nominated to the United States District Court for the Eastern District of Arkansas by President Jimmy Carter on March 7, 1979, to a new seat created by 92 Stat. 1629. He was confirmed by the United States Senate on May 10, 1979, and received his commission on May 11, 1979. Overton continued to serve on that court until his death of cancer on July 14, 1987 at his home.

Notable case

Overton is known for his ruling on Act 590 "The Arkansas' Balanced Treatment Act" in McLean v. Arkansas, which was a law seeking to require the teaching of Creation Science in classrooms. This statute was advocated by its supporters as providing equal treatment of creation science as the Theory of Evolution in the science classrooms.

When Overton struck down the Act in 1982, he used the criteria that a scientific theory must be tentative and always subject to revision or abandonment in light of the facts that are inconsistent with, or falsify, the theory. A theory that is by its own terms dogmatic, absolutist and never subject to revision is not a scientific theory.

In summary, he held that a scientific theory to be taught in schools must have the following properties:

 It is guided by natural law;
 It has to be explained by reference to natural law;
 It is testable against the empirical world;
 Its conclusions are tentative, i.e., are not necessarily the final word;
 It is falsifiable.

References

Sources

External citations

1939 births
1987 deaths
People from Malvern, Arkansas
Judges of the United States District Court for the Eastern District of Arkansas
United States district court judges appointed by Jimmy Carter
20th-century American judges
University of Arkansas School of Law alumni